Maurice Craig may refer to:
 Maurice Craig (historian) (1919–2011), Irish architectural historian
 Maurice Craig (psychiatrist) (1866–1935), British psychiatrist